Lake Karachay, located in the southern Ural Mountains in eastern Russia, was a dumping ground for the Soviet Union's nuclear weapon facilities. It was also affected by a string of accidents and disasters causing the surrounding areas to be highly contaminated with radioactive waste. Although the lake has an area much smaller than that of the Fukushima Daiichi Nuclear Power Plant, and although three settlements, Ozyorsk,  and  some 7 kilometers away are inhabited, and the lake is surrounded by Mayak, the lake is still technically a natural area.  It has been described as the "most polluted spot on Earth" by the Worldwatch Institute.

History  

Built in the late 1940s, Mayak was one of Russia's most prominent nuclear weapons factories. The factory was kept secret by the government until 1990. When Russian president Boris Yeltsin signed a 1992 decree opening the area, Western scientists were able to gain access. The sediment of the lake bed is estimated to be composed almost entirely of high level radioactive waste deposits to a depth of roughly 11 feet (3.4 m).

In 1994, a report revealed that 5 million cubic meters of polluted water had migrated from Lake Karachay, and was spreading to the south and north at 80 meters per year, "threatening to enter water intakes and rivers". The authors acknowledged that "theoretical hazards developed into actual events".

In November 1994, officials from the Russian Ministry of Atomic Energy stated that Soviet officials initiated a process following the 1957 Kyshtym disaster resulting in the transfer of 3 billion curies of high level nuclear waste into deep wells at three other sites.

After a drought caused water levels to drop, revealing contaminated silt, which was then wind blown, further polluting surrounding areas, it was decided to completely fill in the lake. As of December 2016, the lake's status is completely infilled, using special concrete blocks, rock, and dirt. It had been completely backfilled in November 2015, then monitored before placing the final layer of rock and dirt. Monitoring data showed "clear reduction of the deposition of radionuclides on the surface" after 10 months. A decades-long monitoring program for underground water was expected to be implemented shortly after.

The Techa River, which provides water to nearby areas, was contaminated, and about 65% of local residents fell ill with radiation sickness. Doctors called it the "special disease" because they were not allowed to note radiation in their diagnoses as long as the facility was secret. Workers at the plutonium plant were also affected.

Causes 
The pollution of Lake Karachay is connected to the disposal of nuclear materials from Mayak. Among workers, cancer mortality remains an issue. By one estimate, the river contains 120 million curies of radioactive waste.

Prevalence of pollution 
Nuclear waste, either from civilian or military nuclear projects, remains a serious threat to the environment of Russia. Reports suggest that there are few or no road signs warning about the polluted areas surrounding Lake Karachay.

Some parts of the lake are extremely radioactive and one could receive a lethal dose of radiation in 30 minutes.

See also 
 Lake Karachay
 Water pollution
 Plutopia
 Ozyorsk, Chelyabinsk Oblast
 Semipalatinsk Test Site
 Soviet atomic bomb project

References

External links 
 Lake Karachay

Karachal
Radioactively contaminated areas
Nuclear reprocessing sites
Disasters in the Soviet Union
Soviet cover-ups
Nuclear accidents and incidents
Environmental disasters in Europe
Environment of the Soviet Union
Pollution in Russia
1949 disasters in the Soviet Union
1989 disasters in the Soviet Union
1940s disasters in the Soviet Union
1950s disasters in the Soviet Union
1960s disasters in the Soviet Union
1970s disasters in the Soviet Union
1980s disasters in the Soviet Union